Oerlenbach is a municipality  in the district of Bad Kissingen in Bavaria in Germany.

Twin towns
Douvres-la-Délivrande, France

References

Bad Kissingen (district)